(born August 6, 1975 in Funabashi, Chiba) is a retired female medley swimmer from Japan, who represented her native country at the 1996 Summer Olympics in Atlanta, Georgia. She is best known for winning two gold medals at the 1995 Summer Universiade in Fukuoka.

References
 

1975 births
Living people
Japanese female medley swimmers
Olympic swimmers of Japan
Swimmers at the 1996 Summer Olympics
People from Funabashi
Swimmers at the 1990 Asian Games
Asian Games medalists in swimming
Universiade medalists in swimming
Asian Games silver medalists for Japan
Asian Games bronze medalists for Japan
Medalists at the 1990 Asian Games
Universiade gold medalists for Japan
Medalists at the 1995 Summer Universiade
Medalists at the 1997 Summer Universiade
20th-century Japanese women